The 2013 New Haven Open at Yale (New Haven Open at Yale presented by First Niagara for sponsorship reasons) was a women's tennis tournament played on outdoor hard courts. It was the 45th edition of the New Haven Open at Yale, and part of the Premier Series of the 2013 WTA Tour. It took place at the Cullman-Heyman Tennis Center in New Haven, Connecticut, United States, from August 16 through August 24. It was the last event on the 2013 US Open Series before the 2013 US Open.

Singles main-draw entrants

Seeds

 Rankings are as of August 12, 2013

Other entrants
The following players received wildcards into the singles main draw:
  Julia Görges
  Daniela Hantuchová 
  Sloane Stephens

The following players received entry from the qualifying draw:
  Karin Knapp 
  Ayumi Morita
  Monica Puig
  Alison Riske
  Anna Karolína Schmiedlová
  Stefanie Vögele

The following players received entry from a lucky loser spot:
  Elina Svitolina
  Annika Beck

Withdrawals
Before the tournament
  Marion Bartoli (retirement from tennis)
  Magdaléna Rybáriková (lower-back injury)
  Urszula Radwańska (viral illness)

Retirements
  Sorana Cîrstea (abdominal injury)
  Ayumi Morita (low-back injury)
  Peng Shuai (dizziness)

Doubles main-draw entrants

Seeds

Rankings are as of August 12, 2013

Other entrants
The following pair received a wildcard into the doubles main draw:
  Daniela Hantuchová /  Martina Hingis

Finals

Singles

 Simona Halep defeated  Petra Kvitová, 6–2, 6–2.

Doubles

 Sania Mirza /  Zheng Jie defeated  Anabel Medina Garrigues /  Katarina Srebotnik, 6–3, 6–4

References

External links
Official website

 
2013 WTA Tour
August 2013 sports events in the United States